The 2021 Boylesports Irish Greyhound Derby took place during August and September, with the final being held on 18 September at Shelbourne Park. The competition was sponsored by BoyleSports and the prize money purse was €300,000, of which €125,000 went to the winner. 

The ante post favourites were Ballymac Ariel and Explosive Boy. The 2020 English Derby champion Deerjet Sydney and 2021 English Derby finalists Ballymac Fairone and Ballymac Wild all lined up.

The first round was held on 13 & 14 August, second round on 20 & 21 August, third round on 28 August, quarter finals on 4 September and semi finals on 11 September.

The winner was Susie Sapphire who won the first prize of €125,000, she was trained by Owen McKenna and owned and bred by Peter Comerford. Susie Sapphire went unbeaten through the event and was the first bitch to win the Derby since Spring Time at the 1999 Irish Greyhound Derby.

Final result 
At Shelbourne Park (over 550 yards):

Distances 
3, 4½, 4, 9, 7 (0.07 sec = one length)

Quarter finals

Semi finals

Competition report
The first round process of cutting the field from 150 to 96 started on 13 August and saw Explosive Boy start his campaign with a 29.47 win, Ballymac Ariel (29.50), Ballymac Wild (29.66) and Ballymac Fairone (29.67) all scored wins but Jackslittlething recorded a sensational 29.10. Big names Glengar Bale and Ballymac Kingdom were both eliminated.

In the second round Jackslittlething won again (29.71) and this was soon followed by a win for Priceless Jet over De Machine (the Champion Stakes and Kirby Memorial Stakes winner). Oaks runner-up Scooby Princess impressed with a 29.40 on a slow track. The following night Jacob Tashadelek went well again (29.50) and Deerjet Sydney picked up his first win in 29.56. Oaks champion Susie Sapphire claimed a second win in 29.50 and this was followed by superb wins from Ballymac Ariel and Explosive Boy (both 29.40 winners). Deadly Destroyer won the final heat in 29.56.

The third round action was on 28 August and started with an impressive nine length victory for Ballymac Wild in 29.47. Skywalker Cilla took heat 2 (29.45) and Deerjet Sydney won the third heat in 29.75. In heat 4 Ballymac Ariel recorded the fastest time of the competition so far with a 29.07, Explosive Boy was 2nd and Priceless Jet 3rd in a tough race that saw Jacob Tashadelek knocked out. All About Ted then produced a 10 length win (29.35) with Deadly Destroyer eliminated. Carrigeen North and Jackslittlething won heats 7 & 8 and Susie Sapphire remained unbeaten by taking the last heat in 29.31.

The opening quarter final was the strongest of the four heats and resulted in a 29.37 win for Ballymac Ariel, the black bitch remained unbeaten and defeated the likes of Explosive Boy, All About Ted and Deerjet Sydney, with the latter unlucky to be eliminated bearing in mind he recorded 29.75 in fourth place. Another bitch, Singalong Sally caused a surprise by winning her first race of the competition to take a much weaker heat 2. Susie Sapphire then won heat 3 to remain unbeaten and make it three wins for bitches in a heat that saw Ballymac Wild's challenge end. Jackslittlething recorded 29.23 in the final heat.

The semi final draw threw up a contrasting two heats, the second containing most of the favourites. Heat 1 saw All About Ted ease to victory with a 4 length victory ahead of Singalong Sally and Carrigeen North in 29.23. Susie Sapphire led all the way to win the second semi final ahead of Explosive Boy and the previously unbeaten Jackslittlething. The Liam Dowling pair of Ballymac Fairone and Ballymac Ariel were 4th and 5th (the unbeaten Ariel was unlucky after finding trouble) and Priceless Jet brought up the rear.

See also 
2021 UK & Ireland Greyhound Racing Year

References 

Greyhound Derby
Irish Greyhound Derby
Irish Greyhound Derby
Greyhound racing competitions in Dublin (city)
Irish Greyhound Derby